Cosmic Conflict (stylized as Cosmic Conflict!) first person space shoot 'em up and the 11th official game released in 1978 for the Philips Videopac console (known as Magnavox Odyssey² in the United States). The player is  a commander of the Centurion, an Earth Federation starship that guards a remote corner of the galaxy and defend against the alien invasion fleet trying to enslave Earth.

Gameplay

Cosmic Conflict is a 2D shoot 'em up played from a first-person perspective. It is set in outer space with colorful planets in the background. The player must travel within the Centurion and shoot different enemies. The player's score depends upon how many enemies the player is able to shoot.

Reception
In the "Arcade Alley" column of Video magazine it was praised as "a classic space battle that brings the flavor of Star Wars to the home screen".

See also
Star Fire
Tail Gunner

References

External links
 Classic Consoles Center

1978 video games
Shoot 'em ups
Space combat simulators
Magnavox Odyssey 2 games
Video games developed in the United States